Baghmara is a village in Barisal District in the Barisal Division of southern-central Bangladesh.

See also
 List of places in Bangladesh named Baghmara

References

Populated places in Barisal District